Slottsbrons IF is a sports club in Slottsbron, Sweden, playing bandy and association football. The club was founded in 1918. The club has become Swedish champions of bandy four times, 1934, 1936, 1938, and 1941.

Honours

Domestic
 Swedish Champions:
 Winners (4): 1934, 1936, 1938, 1941
 Runners-up (1): 1945

References

External links
 Slottsbrons IF official homepage

Bandy clubs in Sweden
Bandy clubs established in 1918